Dominic Nicholas Anthony Lucanese (August 22, 1897 – July 28, 1982), known professionally as Nick Lucas, was an American jazz guitarist and singer. He was the first jazz guitarist to record as a soloist. His popularity during his lifetime came from his reputation as a singer. His signature song was "Tiptoe Through the Tulips".

Career
Lucas was born into an Italian family in Newark, New Jersey, United States. In 1922, at the age of 25, he gained renown with his hit renditions of "Pickin' the Guitar" and "Teasin' the Frets" for Pathé. In 1923, Gibson Guitars proposed to build him a concert guitar with a deeper body. Known as the "Nick Lucas Special," it became a popular model with guitarists. It was this guitar's outline that was later used as the basis for the Gibson Les Paul solidbody electric guitar. Also in 1923, he began recording for Brunswick and remained one of their exclusive artists until 1932.

In 1929, Lucas co-starred in the Warner Bros. two-color Technicolor musical, Gold Diggers of Broadway, in which he introduced the two hit songs "Painting the Clouds with Sunshine" and "Tiptoe Through the Tulips", which survives in a fully synchronized and preserved Vitaphone disc. The same year, Lucas was featured in the studio's all-star revue, The Show of Shows. Lucas turned down Warner Bros. seven-year contract offer, which went instead to fellow crooner Dick Powell.

In April 1930, Warner bought Brunswick and gave him his own orchestra, billed on his records as "The Crooning Troubadours". This arrangement lasted until December 1931, when Warner licensed Brunswick to the American Record Corporation (ARC). The new owners were not as extravagant as Warner Bros. had previously been and Lucas lost his orchestra and eventually left Brunswick in 1932. He made two recordings for Durium in 1932 for their Hit of the Week series. These would prove to be his last major recordings.

Lucas spent the rest of his career performing on radio, in night clubs and dance halls. He made a number of recordings for small or independent labels, including Cavalier, where he was billed as the "Cavalier Troubadour." In 1944, he reprised some of his old hits in soundies movie musicals, and filmed another group of songs for Snader Telescriptions in 1951, including his hit of "Walkin' My Baby Back Home". He signed with Accent in 1955 and remained with the label for 25 years. He once made an extended eight-month tour of Australia when he was on the road.

In 1974, his renditions of the songs, "I'm Gonna Charleston Back to Charleston", "When You and I Were Seventeen" and "Five Foot Two, Eyes of Blue" were featured on the soundtrack of The Great Gatsby (1974), selected by the film’s musical director Nelson Riddle.

Lucas became friends with Tiny Tim, who considered him an inspiration and who borrowed "Tiptoe Through the Tulips" as his own theme song. Lucas sang the song for him when he married Miss Vicki on The Tonight Show Starring Johnny Carson on December 17, 1969.

Lucas, who enjoyed a long marriage of 65 years, died in Colorado Springs, Colorado, of double pneumonia three weeks before his 85th birthday.

Discography
 Painting the Clouds with Sunshine (Decca, 1957)
 Tip-Toe Thru' The Tulips (ASV Living Era, 2000)

References

External links

Official site

 Nick Lucas recordings at the Discography of American Historical Recordings

1897 births
1982 deaths
American male film actors
American jazz guitarists
American jazz singers
Musicians from Newark, New Jersey
Vaudeville performers
20th-century American male actors
20th-century American singers
American people of Italian descent
20th-century American guitarists
Guitarists from New Jersey
Brunswick Records artists